In mathematics, a Gaussian rational number is a complex number of the form p + qi, where p and q are both rational numbers.
The set of all Gaussian rationals forms the Gaussian rational field, denoted Q(i), obtained by adjoining the imaginary number i to the field of rationals.

Properties of the field
The field of Gaussian rationals provides an example of an algebraic number field, which is both a quadratic field and a cyclotomic field (since  i is a 4th root of unity).  Like all quadratic fields it is a Galois extension of Q with Galois group cyclic of order two, in this case generated by complex conjugation, and is thus an abelian extension of Q, with conductor 4.

As with cyclotomic fields more generally, the field of Gaussian rationals is neither ordered nor complete (as a metric space). The Gaussian integers Z[i] form the ring of integers of Q(i). The set of all Gaussian rationals is countably infinite.

Ford spheres
The concept of Ford circles can be generalized from the rational numbers to the Gaussian rationals, giving Ford spheres. In this construction, the complex numbers are embedded as a plane in a three-dimensional Euclidean space, and for each Gaussian rational point in this plane one constructs a sphere tangent to the plane at that point.

References

Cyclotomic fields

it:Intero di Gauss#Campo dei quozienti